The Rwanda National Police is the national police service of Rwanda.

History
The service was created on 16 June 2000 by law No. 09 of 2000 and merged three earlier forces, the Gendarmerie Nationale of the Ministry of Defence, the Communal Police of the Ministry of Internal Affairs and the Judicial Police of the Ministry of Justice.currently Dan Munyuza is the inspector general of the Rwanda national police.

Future
A state-of-the-art forensic laboratory will open in Kigali in 2017, with the technicians to staff it undergoing training in Germany.

Mission

The RNP vision is: people in Rwanda are safe, involved and reassured. The Mission is dedication to the delivery of high quality services, accountability and transparency, safeguard the rule of law and provide a safe and crime free environment for all.

See also
Law enforcement in Rwanda

References

External links
Official website

Law enforcement in Rwanda